Oleksiy Sych (born 1 April 2001) is a professional Ukrainian football midfielder who plays on loan for Kortrijk from Rukh Lviv.

Career
Sych was born in Zorya, Rivne Raion, Ukraine and is a product of the FC Karpaty Lviv School Sportive System. He made a one and half year break in the playing career, because of injury.

He made his debut for Karpaty Lviv as the main-squad player in the draw away derby match against FC Lviv on 14 March 2020 in the Ukrainian Premier League.

Personal life
His father, Mykola Sych is a retired football player.

References

External links

 

2001 births
Living people
Ukrainian footballers
Association football midfielders
Ukraine under-21 international footballers
Ukrainian Premier League players
Ukrainian Second League players
Belgian Pro League players
FC Karpaty Lviv players
FC Rukh Lviv players
FC Karpaty Halych players
K.V. Kortrijk players
Ukrainian expatriate footballers
Expatriate footballers in Belgium
Ukrainian expatriate sportspeople in Belgium
Sportspeople from Rivne Oblast